Ceranemota semifasciata is a moth in the family Drepanidae. It was described by Foster Hendrickson Benjamin in 1938. It is found in North America, where it has been recorded from northern California.

References

Moths described in 1938
Thyatirinae